Quintus Cornelius Pudens was a Roman senator and early Christian.

According to legend, Quintus Cornelius and his wife Priscilla were among the first converted by St. Peter in Rome, and hosted the apostle in their house. Quintus was father to Saint Pudens and grandfather of Saints Novatus, Timotheus, Praxedes and Pudentiana.

References

 St. Novatus, Catholic Encyclopedia.

Senators of the Roman Empire
People in the Pauline epistles
1st-century Romans